Körber AG is a strategic management holding company based in Hamburg. In 2020, the group had approximately 10,000 employees at more than 100 locations worldwide and generated sales of €1.76 billion.

History

1946–1992 
On July 14, 1946, Kurt A. Körber paved the way for the first business deals in Hamburg. On February 1, 1947, he established Hauni Maschinenfabrik Körber & Co. KG (from 1958: Hauni-Werke Körber & Co. KG). The company originally only produced machines for the tobacco industry. In 1953, it moved to a new location within Hamburg's Bergedorf district. One year later, it had more than 1,000 employees. The group's international expansion began in 1948, when Eric M. Warburg, who had been living in exile, helped Körber establish contact with American cigarette manufacturers. In 1951, Körber's machines were successful at a tobacco trade show in Amsterdam. By 1953, his company exported 80 percent of its products, and machines from Hauni plants were used in 48 countries. In 1955, the company established a plant in Richmond, Virginia, which was followed by additional facilities through the mid-1960s.

The diversification of the company began in 1970, when it purchased E. C. H. Will, a manufacturer of paper-processing machines that was based in Hamburg-Lokstedt. The new business division was strengthened in 1976 through the acquisition of Womako Maschinenkonstruktion GmbH (Stuttgart). At the request of German Chancellor Helmut Schmidt, Körber purchased the grinding machine manufacturer Blohm in Bergedorf in 1978. It served as the nucleus for the company's third business division. The acquisition of Schaudt Maschinenbau GmbH (Stuttgart and Ellwangen) in 1983 broadened its foundation.

In the mid-1980s, the group generated sales of over one billion DM for the first time. On June 17, 1987, the group was transformed into Körber AG, which absorbed Hauni-Werke Körber & Co. KG.

1990–present 
In the 1990s, the group's grinding machine segment, Schleifring, was under pressure due to restructuring costs, exchange rates, fluctuating commodity prices, and a tough price war within the sector. The business division for paper processing expanded during these years. Among other things, this was due to the acquisition of two Italian companies for the production and packaging of tissue products and the gradual purchase of a majority holding in a machine manufacturer for the production of envelopes and other paper products.

Following Körber's passing on August 10, 1992, the company's assets were transferred to the Körber Foundation. The Foundation was created on January 1, 1981, through the merger of the Kurt A. Körber Stiftung (established in 1959) and the Hauni Stiftung (established in 1969). Until Körber's death, the Foundation had held 34.9 percent of the shares. Since then, the group's annual dividend has been paid out completely to the Körber Foundation.

In 1995, Körber AG became a management holding company, which supervised the group's three business divisions at the time. 

In 2002, the company entered a new market: packaging for pharmaceutical products. In the following years, this segment was expanded further through acquisitions. It has been a separate business division since 2009.

In 2012, Körber divested itself of several subsidiaries for paper processing machines, including E. C. H. Will.<ref>Körber AG verkauft Paper Systems an Investorengruppe". In: Deutscher Drucker, No. 7, 1 March 2012.</ref>

As a result of a number of restructuring measures, Körber was divided into seven business divisions in 2015: Automation, Logistics Systems, Machine Tools, Pharma Systems, Tissue, Tobacco, and Corporate Ventures. In 2017, the business division Körber Digital was added. It manages the digitization of the group and the development of new digital business models. One year later, the group sold the Machine Tools and Automation business divisions. Since 2020, the group and its business divisions and companies have appeared as a single, unified brand: Körber. The only exception is the Tobacco business division, which operates on the market as the Hauni Group. From September 2022 onwards, the Hauni Group was renamed to Körber Technologies. 

In early 2022, Körber acquired Siemens Logistics' mail and parcel business to strengthen its Supply Chain business area. 

 Group structure 
The group is active in five business divisions:Information about the structure is also provided by Kopp, Martin (3 December 2020). Körber-Maschinen derzeit gefragt. Hamburger Konzern liefert Lösungen für Verpackungen von Corona-Impfstoff. In: Bergedorfer Zeitung, 3 December 2020.
 Digital manages the digital advancement of the entire group and develops new digital business models and ventures.
 Pharma offers machines for processes for the manufacturing, inspection, and packaging of medications and for the traceability of these products.
 Supply Chain focuses on technologies for production logistics. Its product range includes software, automation machines, voice applications, robotics, and transportation systems.
 Tissue offers processing and packaging machines for toilet paper, kitchen towels, folded paper napkins, and paper towels.
 Tobacco supports manufacturers that process tobacco, produce filters and cigarettes, offer measuring and analysis equipment, and produce flavoring—it also does this for new tobacco products in the heat-not-burnVoigt, Thomas (15 June 2018). Fast wie vor der Krise: Hauni hat sich erholt. In: Bergedorfer Zeitung, 15 June 2018. and vaping categories. Additionally, the division offers machines for the production of drinking straws.

 Further reading 
 Hauser, Evelyn, updated by Cohen, M. L.: Körber AG. In: International Directory of Company Histories''. Vol. 173, Farmington Hills: St. James Press, Farmington Hills, San Francisco, New York, 2016, pp. 351–356.

References

Engineering companies of Germany
Manufacturing companies based in Hamburg
Companies established in 1995